Rodrigo Salomón (born July 27, 1980 in Temperley, Argentina) is an Argentine Association Football Defender last played for Paysandu of the Serie C in Brazil.

Teams
  Temperley 1999-2005
  General Caballero 2005
  Temperley 2006-2008
  Pérez Zeledón 2008-2010
  Paysandu 2011
  Midland 2012-2013
  Talleres 2013–present

External links
 Profile at BDFA 
 

1980 births
Living people
Argentine footballers
Argentine expatriate footballers
Club Atlético Temperley footballers
Talleres de Remedios de Escalada footballers
Municipal Pérez Zeledón footballers
General Caballero Sport Club footballers
Paysandu Sport Club players
Expatriate footballers in Brazil
Expatriate footballers in Paraguay
Expatriate footballers in Costa Rica
Association football defenders